The men's 105 kg competition of the weightlifting events at the 2015 Pan American Games in Toronto, Canada, was held on July 15 at the Oshawa Sports Centre. The defending champion was Jorge Arroyo from Ecuador.

Schedule

All times are Eastern Daylight Time (UTC-4).

Results
7 athletes from five countries took part.

References

External links
Weightlifting schedule

Weightlifting at the 2015 Pan American Games